Nandivada mandal is one of the 25 mandals in the Krishna district of the Indian state of Andhra Pradesh.

References 

Mandals in Krishna district